Dipaenae zygaenoides is a moth of the subfamily Arctiinae first described by Hervé de Toulgoët in 1983. It is found in French Guiana.

References

Lithosiini